Javier Faus (born in Barcelona, Spain) is a leading Spanish private equity investor, chairman and founder of the Barcelona-based alternative investment fund management firm Meridia Capital Partners. Very active in civic associations, he served as Vice Chairman of FC Barcelona (2010 to 2015). From july 2019 until july 2022, he chaired the Cercle d’Economía, a leading Spanish think tank that promotes liberal democracy public policies.

Early life and education
He has a Law Degree from Universidad Autónoma de Barcelona, a Masters in International Law from Georgetown University (Washington, D.C.) and an Executive MBA from ESADE Business School (Barcelona).

Career
Prior to his investment career, Mr. Faus worked as an M&A lawyer in the offices of J&A Garrigues (New York City) and Cuatrecasas Abogados (Barcelona).

In 2001, he led a consortium to acquire HOVISA, the real estate company that owned Hotel Arts in Barcelona (Ritz-Carlton), amongst other assets. He subsequently became president and minority shareholder for the company. In 2006 he managed the sale of HOVISA to a JV formed by Host Hotels & Resorts and GIC (Government of Singapore). This deal reached, at the time, the highest price ever paid for a single real estate asset in Spain (417 million euros).

Between 2003 and 2006, Mr. Faus was managing Partner for Spain and Portugal at Patron Capital Partners, a London-based real estate fund manager.

In 2006 Mr. Faus founded Meridia Capital Partners, a private equity fund management firm specialized in private equity and real estate. Its first fund, Meridia I, invested in urban hotel real estate including the W Paris Opéra Hotel, the Four Seasons Hotel in Mexico City, the Ritz-Carlton Hotel in Santiago de Chile and the InterContinental Hotel in São Paulo. In 2014 Meridia Capital launched Meridia II (Spain; Value-add; CRE) and subsequently Meridia III (2016) and Meridia IV (2019), all with similar strategies.

In 2016, Meridia Capital made initial investments in the private equity space through its vehicle Meridia Private Equity I. The fund currently has 5 portfolio companies: Sosa Ingredients, Grupo Andilana, Futbol Emotion, Volotea and Kipenzi.

Additionally Meridia acts, since 2019, as exclusive advisor in Spain and Portugal for Franklin Templeton´s pan-European Social Infrastructure Fund, a fund seeking financial returns while delivering a measurable social and environmental impact.

Mr. Faus is also an active business angel in the Spanish start-up arena, having invested in companies such as Cocunat, Colvin Co, AGORA Images and WorldCoo under the umbrella of Mnext Venture Capital.

Between 2010 and 2014 he was a member of the board of directors at Inmobiliaria Colonial, one of the leading public Spanish Real Estate companies. Since 2016 he is a member of the board of directors of Indukern, a leading Spanish pharmaceutical company.

Mr. Faus has won several awards, including the 2002 Deal of the Year by International Hotel Investment Forum and the SAHIC 2011 Award for Best Investor.

On July 24, 2019, Mr. Faus was elected president of the Circle of Economics. Mr. Faus, who was the only candidate, was proclaimed president with 423 favorable votes, 1 vote against and one abstention. Mr. Faus announced the creation of an advisory council that would be led by the outgoing president, Juan José Brugera, and the two former presidents, the professor of the University of Barcelona, Anton Costas and the former minister of the People's Party, Josep Piqué. He also made public that the new  management board would be equally gendered: 10 men and 10 women of renowned prestige.

Controversies
In 1996, Javier Faus received the direct award and the mandate from the president of FC Barcelona at that time, Josep Lluís Núñez, to start up the thematic venue "Màgic Barça" in the Olympic Village of Barcelona. This millionaire investment was firstly planned to replicate it in other clubs of the Spanish premier division. The site did not have the expected success and the failure was spectacular. In 1998, "Màgic Barça" closed the business and the idea was no longer exported to any other club.

In June 2005, Javier Faus resigned from the management board of FC Barcelona, which was led by Joan Laporta, after Sandro Rosell, Josep Maria Bartomeu, Jordi Moix and Jordi Monés did so a few days earlier. Javier Faus argued personal and professional reasons, but his alienation with President Laporta was also decisive and he was marginalized from the club's negotiations to agree on certain sponsorships.

In 2010, after the victory of the candidacy presided over by Sandro Rosell to the presidency of FC Barcelona, Javier Faus was appointed economic vice president of the management board, issued the reformulation of the accounts presented by the outgoing management board chaired by Joan Laporta, and promoted social liability actions against the former management board that was approved by the members assembly. In July 2011, the management board filed a lawsuit in court. In October 2014, the court dismissed the claim and determined that the overall result during the Laporta's mandate had been a positive balance.

In 2010, Sandro Rosell and Javier Faus had been the main promoters of the sponsorship agreement with Qatar to incorporate advertising on FC Barcelona's shirts. Javier Faus and Rosell would have turned a blind eye on the apparent conflict of interests in which they were involved during the negotiation of the agreement. Javier Faus was a board member of Inmobiliaria Colonial, a company owned by the American fund Colony Capital, which in its turn was the owner of 70% of the Paris Saint-Germain Football Club. In December 2010, FC Barcelona signed the agreement to sell the shirt's rights to Qatar Sports Investments (QSI) and, six months later, QSI acquired 70% of PSG from Colony Capital. In May 2014, Javier Faus resigned his position as a Colonial CEO, coinciding with his arrival in the real estate of the investment fund Qatar Investment Authority.

In June 2011, Javier Faus announced the reduction of 50% of the budget allocated to other sports sections and the removal of the baseball section as its maintenance was considered unsustainable. This measure caused controversy because it implied a relatively small savings, but also because the management board had promised that would promote the multidisciplinary sports character of the club, during the electoral campaign.

In November 2012, Javier Faus announced that, for the forthcoming season, the shirt sponsor would be modified from the Qatar Foundation to Qatar Airways in application of one of the clauses of the initial contract. A clause that was unknown either by the journalists or by the Barça partners. Javier Faus admitted that it had been the request from the sponsor, and that it had to be taken into account the loyalty to a collaborating partner.

In December 2013, as economic vice president of FC Barcelona, Javier Faus was involved in controversial statements about the renewal of Leo Messi that provoked the indignation of Messi's family environment, but also Messi himself had an angry reaction. Javier Faus stated in a radio channel (RAC1) that: «I would not understand that the club renewed Leo Messi's contract again, because it was extended and improved the previous year» and he recalled: «I do not know why we should do it again, we do not have to submit a contract improvement every six months». Leo Messi replied with expressions like: «Faus does not know anything about football.» «I remember (to Mr. Faus) that neither I nor anyone in my environment has asked for any improvement or renewal» or «Barça is the best team in the world and should be represented by the best leaders». In January 2014, Mr. Faus qualified his statements saying that there had been no bad faith and that: «Sometimes they say things they do not want to say».

In November 2014, the former candidate for the presidency of FC Barcelona, Agustí Benedito, stated in a press conference that Faus had interests and business in Qatar while he was belonging to the Barça's management board.  Javier Faus filed a complaint against Benedito, who had refused to retract. The court dismissed the lawsuit and sentenced Javier Faus to pay the court costs.

References

External links 
 Meridia Capital
 Cercle d'Economia

Living people
People from Barcelona
Autonomous University of Barcelona alumni
Georgetown University Law Center alumni
FC Barcelona non-playing staff
ESADE alumni
1964 births